Fouad Idabdelhay (born May 2, 1988) is a Dutch footballer who most recently played for Wydad Casablanca.

Biography
Born in Bergen op Zoom, North Brabant to Moroccan parents, Idabdelhay made his début in 2007/2008 against Stormvogels Telstar Reserves in the KNVB Cup. He replaced Matthew Amoah in the attack in the 78th minute. Three minutes later, he scored the winning goal for NAC Breda.

A few days later, he made his Eredivisie debut against PSV Eindhoven. Short before the final whistle he replaced Viktor Sikora.

On 22 January 2008, Idabdelhay scored his first Eredivisie goal against AZ Alkmaar, before he was substituted 18 minutes before the final whistle. A few minutes later he scored the 1–1 for NAC Breda. In the last minute he scored his second goal, and gave NAC the victory. A week later, against Roda JC, Idabdelhay was substituted in the 68th minute. In the same minute he was substituted, he scored the 2–0 goal, which was also the final result.

On 13 July 2011, Idabelhay signed a two-year contract with the German 3. Liga side VfL Osnabrück, but he was released six months later.

In February 2013, Idabdelhay signed with FC Dordrecht until the end of the season, scoring 7 goals. After leaving FC Dordrecht, Idabdelhay signed with AEL Limassol.

In August 2014, Idabdelhay signed a three-year contract with Wydad Casablanca. After only one game for Wydad Casablanca, Idabdelhay suffered a back injury. After not being paid by Wydad Idabdelhay was set to be loaned to Chabab Rif Al Hoceima, but the deal fell through, due to not being paid his owed salary by Wydad. Idabdelhay left Wydad after not being paid for three months.

References

External links
 

1988 births
Living people
Sportspeople from Bergen op Zoom
Footballers from North Brabant
Dutch sportspeople of Moroccan descent
Dutch footballers
Netherlands youth international footballers
NAC Breda players
RKC Waalwijk players
VfL Osnabrück players
Wydad AC players
AEL Limassol players
Eredivisie players
Eerste Divisie players
3. Liga players
Cypriot First Division players
Dutch expatriate footballers
Dutch expatriate sportspeople in Germany
Dutch expatriate sportspeople in Morocco
Expatriate footballers in Germany
Expatriate footballers in Cyprus
Expatriate footballers in Morocco
Association football forwards